MS American Monarch is a factory stern fishing trawler. At over 6,000 GRT, the ship can process 1,200 tons of fish a day. British historian David Edgerton has noted that: "since the total global catch is 100 million tons per annum ... 300 of these ships could catch all the fish now caught worldwide".

References

External links
American Monarch technical information

Trawlers
Ships built in Norway
1996 ships